Daniel Gappmaier known as Dany Gappmaier (born 26 September 1991) is a speedway rider from Austria. He is a six time champion of Austria.

Career
Gappmaier signed for Berwick Bandits for the 2016 Premier League speedway season season. The following season he was retained by Berwick but also signed for Swindon Robins in the top tier of British Speedway riding for the in the SGB Premiership 2017. In 2019, he secured his sixth Austrian Individual Speedway Championship.

He continued to ride for the Berwick Bandits from and entered his fifth season with the club in the SGB Championship 2021.

References 

1991 births
Living people
Austrian speedway riders
Belle Vue Aces riders
Berwick Bandits riders
Swindon Robins riders
Sportspeople from Salzburg